Robert Javier Burbano Cobeña (born 10 April 1995) is an Ecuadorian footballer who plays for Orense S.C. .

Club career

Youth career
Robert Burbano began his professional career with Independiente del Valle, but only played 2 games in 2012. He was later signed by Club Sport Emelec.

Emelec

2013–2015
With Emelec, Burbano was given more playing time by Emelec coach Gustavo Quinteros, playing 9 games in the 2013 season. Robert Burbano became 2013 Serie A season champions that year.
Robert Burbano got much more playing time in the 2014 Serie A season with Emelec. His only goal of the season came March 23, in a 3–0 win over LDU Quito. He proved to be an important player for Quintero's Emelec, and reached the 2014 Ecuadorian Serie A season final against Barcelona SC, and won the league that year.
Robert Burbano scored his first international club–goal of the 2015 season on March 4, in a 2015 Copa Libertadores group–stage match against Sport Club Internacional, though lost the match 3–2.

International career

Honors

Club
Emelec
Serie A (3): 2013, 2014, 2015, 2017, 2019

References

1995 births
Living people
Association football wingers
C.S.D. Independiente del Valle footballers
C.S. Emelec footballers
Delfín S.C. footballers
Ecuadorian Serie A players
Ecuadorian footballers